Fazle Azim Molla was an Indian politician and educationist. He was a Member of the West Bengal Legislative Assembly from the Garden Reach Assembly constituency since 1987 to 1996. He was associated with the Indian National Congress.

Molla established Matiabruj Girls High School in 1966.

References 

West Bengal MLAs 1987–1991
West Bengal MLAs 1991–1996
People from South 24 Parganas district
Year of birth missing